The 2014 NCAA Division I Field Hockey Championship is the 34th women's collegiate field hockey tournament organized by the National Collegiate Athletic Association, to determine the top college field hockey team from Division I in the United States. The championship was played on November 23, 2014 at the Maryland Field Hockey & Lacrosse Complex, the home field of the host Maryland Terrapins, in College Park, Maryland. The Connecticut Huskies won their fourth national championship, and second consecutive title, by defeating the Syracuse Orange, 1–0, in the final match.

National seeds

Bracket

References 

2014
Field Hockey
2014 in women's field hockey
2014 in sports in Maryland